Aminobiphenyl may refer to:

 2-Aminobiphenyl (2-APB)
 3-Aminobiphenyl
 4-Aminobiphenyl (4-APB)